Palais Esterházy an der Wallnerstraße is a baroque palace in Vienna (location of the Esterházykeller restaurant).

Palais Esterházy may also refer to:
 Palais Esterházy, Bratislava, Slovakia (location of the Slovak National Gallery)
 Palais Esterházy an der Kärntner Straße (de),  Vienna (location of Casino Wien)
 Palais Erdődy (originally Palais Esterházy), Vienna (demolished in 1955)

See also 

 Schloss Esterházy